Alexandrovsky District is an administrative district (raion), one of the twenty-six in Stavropol Krai, Russia. Municipally, it is incorporated as Alexandrovsky Municipal District. It is located in the center of the krai. Its administrative center is the rural locality (a selo) of Alexandrovskoye. Population:  50,978 (2002 Census); 49,434 (1989 Census). The population of Alexandrovskoye accounts for 54.7% of the district's total population.

History
In 1924, Alexandrovsky Uyezd of Stavropol Governorate was transformed into a district of Stavropol Okrug within North Caucasus Krai. It underwent various administrative changes in the following years. In its current state, the district was established in 1972.

Economy
The area has more than 450 enterprises of different ownership forms and specialties. The main occupation by far, however, is agriculture, which accounts for 80% of GDP. More than 15,000 families work on a private farm.

References

Notes

Sources

Districts of Stavropol Krai